is a Japanese immunologist and academic, best known for his discovery of interleukin-6. Since August 2011, he has served as the 17th President of Osaka University.

Chronology 
1972 - graduated from Graduate School of Medicine, Osaka University
1980 - assistant professor in the School of Medicine, Kumamoto University
1984 - assistant professor at Institute for Molecular and Cellular Biology, Osaka University
1989 - professor at the same university
2004 - Dean of Graduate School of Frontier Biosciences, Osaka University
2008 - Dean of Graduate School of Medicine, Osaka University
August 2011 - the 17th president of Osaka University

Honors and awards
Erwin von Balz prize (Japan), 1986
CIBA-GEIGY Rheumatism Prize (Japan), 1990
Sandoz Prize for Immunology, 1992
 (Japan), 1997
Mochida Memorial Prize (Japan), 1998
ISI Citation Laureate Award (Japan), 1981–98, 2000
The , 2004 The Fujiwara Foundation of Science
Medical Award of The Japan Medical Association, 2005, The Japan Medical Association
Medal of Honor with Purple Ribbon, April, 2006
The Crafoord Prize in Polyarthritis 2009
The Japan Prize for the discovery of interleukin-6, 2011
Clarivate Citation Laureates, 2021

References

Japanese immunologists
1947 births
Living people
People from Osaka Prefecture
Osaka University alumni
Academic staff of Osaka University